The Sheikh Ahmed Sharif Mosque is small mosque in the historical Shingani district in Mogadishu.

Overview 
The current Sheikh Ahmed Sharif Mosque was built in 1918, however this site is home to 2 previous older mosques built on top of one another and this mosque site could be home to Mogadishu oldest mosque. The mosque was demolished in the winter of 1985-86 was built in 1730-40 and mosque prior to that was built during the 17th century and the oldest mosque was built during the 13th century.

Controversy 
The Sheikh Ahmed Sharif mosque was built in 1337 AH (1918 CE), after there was dispute between two local clans; the Asharaf clan and the 'Amuudi clan. The two clans both from Shingani district dispute first started after the Asharaf clan had removed the Khatiib of the mosque from office - they had no right to do this as this Khatib had been chosen by elders from both clans. The Asharaf clan then went to build the Sheikh Ahmed Sharif mosque nearby and the dispute only ended in 1339 AH (1921 CE), only after there was an intervention by Mr. Carlo Avolio who was director of the Municipality at time along with the local clans in Mogadishu (Shingani and Hamar Weyne) and many religious leader to resolve the problems of the two opposing groups. After this intervention a verdict was given that the 'Amuudi clan pray twelve Fridays in the Sheikh Ahmed Mosque and the Asharaf returned to pray in the original Friday mosque. The 'Amudi's accepted the new khatiib to be chosen from the Asharaf, and peace was made between them.

See also 

 'Adayga (Aw Musse)
 Aw Mukhtar & Aw Sheikh Omar (The Twin Mosques)
 Awooto Eeday
 Fakhrudiin
 Jaama' Xamar Weyne
 Mohamed Al Tani
 Sheikh Rumani Ba 'Alawi
 Arba'a Rukun
 Jaama' Shingani

References 

Buildings and structures in Mogadishu
Mosques in Somalia